The list of Brazilian footballers in Serie B records the association football players from Brazil who have appeared at least once for a team in the Italian Serie B. Entries in bold denote players still active in actual season.

A
Adaílton – Verona, Genoa, Bologna – 2002–08
Adriano (Adriano Pereira da Silva) – Atalanta – 2005–06
Adriano (Adriano Louzada) – Reggina – 2012–14
Adryan – Brescia – 2022–
Aílton – Bari – 2001–02
Aldair – Genoa – 2003–04
Alemão – Vicenza, Varese – 2010–12
Alfred – Salernitana – 2000–01
Amarildo – Cesena – 1991–92
Anderson – Venezia, Brescia, Ancona – 2002–06, 2008–09
Robert Anderson – Genoa, Treviso – 2003–04, 2006–07
Ângelo – Crotone, Lecce, Siena, Latina – 2006–08, 2009–10, 2013–15
Artur – Cesena – 2007–08
Paulo Azzi – Cittadella, Spezia, Modena, Cagliari – 2013–14, 2015–16, 2022–

B
Babù – Salernitana, Venezia, Lecce, Verona, Triestina, Avellino – 2001–04, 2006–09
Barreto – Treviso, Bari – 2003–05, 2007–09
Fábio Bilica – Venezia, Palermo – 2000–01, 2002–03
Binho – Empoli, Livorno – 1999–00, 2002–03
Bondi – Salernitana, Arezzo, Grosseto – 2002–03, 2006–07, 2010–11
Eric Botteghin – Ascoli – 2021–
Branco – Brescia – 1987–88
Gabriel Brazão – SPAL – 2022–

C

Caetano – Frosinone, Crotone, Varese – 2009–14
Caio Secco – Crotone – 2013–15
Canè – Napoli, Bari – 1963–65, 1970–71
Carlos Augusto – Monza – 2020–22
Walter Casagrande – Ascoli – 1990–91
Catê – Sampdoria – 1999–2000
Mateus Cecchini Müller – Entella – 2020–21
César – Catania, Chievo, Padova, Juve Stabia, Virtus Entella – 2004–06, 2007–08, 2009–12, 2014–15
Lucas Chiaretti – Cittadella, Foggia, Pordenone – 2016–20
Claiton – Varese, Bari, Crotone, Cremonese – 2010–13, 2014–16, 2017–20
Sergio Clerici – Lecco – 1962–66
Igor Coronado – Trapani, Palermo – 2015–18
Cribari – Empoli – 1999–2002
Felipe Curcio – Brescia, Salernitana – 2017–21

D
Da Costa – Ancona, Sampdoria, Bologna – 2008–10, 2011–12, 2014–15
Victor Da Silva – Pescara, Brescia – 2014–15
William Da Silva – Verona – 2006–07
Danilo – Parma – 2021–
Caio De Cenco – Trapani – 2015–17
Marcos de Paula – Padova, Bari – 2010–12
Rodrigo Defendi – Avellino – 2007–09
Armando del Debbio – Lucchese – 1925–26
Di Fabio – Cagliari – 2002–04
Diego – Padova – 2009–10
Digão – Rimini, Lecce, Crotone – 2005–07, 2009–10
Diniz – Livorno – 2008–09
Guilherme do Prado – Catania, Mantova, Perugia, Spezia, Cesena – 2002–03, 2004–05, 2007–08, 2009–10
Doriva – Sampdoria – 1999–2000

E
Edmar – Pescara – 1989–91
Edinho – Lecce – 2009–10
Edson – Genoa – 1997–98
Eloi – Genoa – 1984–85
Rodrigo Ely – Reggina, Varese, Avellino – 2012–15
Emerson – Reggina, Livorno – 2011–13, 2014–15
Alan Empereur – Livorno, Salernitana, Foggia, Bari, Verona – 2014–16, 2017–19

F
Fabiano (Fabiano Lima Rodrigues) – Arezzo, Genoa, Vicenza – 2005–07, 2009–10
Fabiano (Fabiano Medina da Silva) – Lecce – 2007–08, 2009–10
Fabinho – Modena, Perugia – 2011–12, 2014–15
Diego Farias – Nocerina, Padova, Cagliari, Benevento – 2011–13, 2015–16, 2021–
Faustinho – Palermo – 1964–65
Fernando (José Ferdinando Puglia) – Bari – 1964–65
Adriano Ferreira Pinto – Perugia, Cesena, Atalanta, Varese – 2004–06, 2010–11, 2012–14
Filipe – Varese – 2011–13
Lucas Finazzi – Brescia – 2012–14

G
Denilson Gabionetta – Pisa, Albinoleffe, Crotone, Torino, Salernitana – 2007–13, 2015–16
Gabriel (Gabriel Appelt Pires) – Pro Vercelli, Spezia, Pescara – 2012–15
Gabriel (Gabriel Vasconcelos Ferreira) – Carpi, Empoli, Perugia, Lecce – 2014–15, 2017–19, 2020–22
Gilberto – Latina – 2016–17
Gladestony – Pro Vercelli – 2017–18
Gladstone – Verona – 2005–06
Gelson – Pistoiese – 2001–02
Gleison Santos – Atalanta, Albinoleffe, Reggina – 2003–04, 2006–07, 2009–10
José Gelardi – Padova – 1934–35
Leandro Gobatto – Piacenza – 2006–07
Leandro Guerreiro – Salernitana, Pescara – 2003–05
Rodrigo Guth – Pescara – 2020–21

H
Hernani – Reggina – 2022–
Humberto – Torino – 2004–05

J

Jeda – Vicenza, Siena, Palermo, Piacenza, Catania, Crotone, Rimini – 2001–08
Jéffe – Frosinone, Latina, Livorno – 2009–10, 2013–16
Jefferson – Modena – 2011–12
João Paulo – Bari – 1992–94
Joelson – Albinoleffe, Pisa, Reggina, Grosseto – 2004–07, 2008–10
Jonathas – Brescia, Latina – 2011–12, 2013–14
Juliano – Lecce, Pisa – 2006–08

L

Francisco Lima – Brescia – 2006–08
Luciano – Chievo – 2000–01, 2007–08
Luvanor – Catania – 1984–86

M
Filipe Machado – Salernitana – 2009–10
Maicon – Reggina, Livorno – 2011–12, 2013–16, 2018–19
Marcelinho – Catania – 2014–15
Mancini – Venezia – 2002–03
Marco Aurélio – Vicenza, Palermo, Cosenza – 1999–2000, 2001–03
Marcón – Venezia – 2002–03
Martinho – Verona, Catania, Bari, Ascoli – 2012–13, 2014–15, 2016–19
Ryder Matos – Verona, Empoli, Perugia – 2018–19, 2020–
Matuzalém – Napoli, Bologna – 1999–2000, 2014–15
Fernando Menegazzo – Catania – 2004–05
Junior Messias – Crotone – 2019–20
Mezavilla – Catania, Cesena, Pisa, Juve Stabia – 2004–05, 2006–08, 2011–13, 2019–20
Milton – Como – 1989–90
Montresor – Treviso – 2006–07
Mozart – Reggina – 2001–02
Müller – Torino – 1989–90
Murilo – Livorno – 2018–20

N
Nenê – Spezia, Bari - 2014–18
Neto Pereira – Varese – 2010–15
Nícolas – Verona, Lanciano, Trapani, Reggina, Pisa – 2012–13, 2014–17, 2020–

O
Oliveira – Cittadella, Vicenza – 2008–11

P
Paco Soares – Fidelis Andria – 1997–98
Paquito – Ravenna, Cosenza, Crotone – 2000–02, 2005–06
Paulinho – Grosseto, Livorno, Cremonese – 2007–09, 2011–13, 2017–19
Pedrinho – Catania – 1984–86
Pelado – Treviso – 1999–01
Luís Atílio Pennacchi – Lucchese – 1939–41
Paulo Pereira – Genoa – 1996–98
Inácio Piá – Ascoli, Napoli, Treviso, Torino, Portogruaro – 2003–04, 2006–08, 2009–11
Guillermo Piantoni – Palermo – 1931–32
Pinga – Torino, Siena – 2000–05

R
Rafael – Verona, Cagliari – 2011–13, 2015–16
Reginaldo – Treviso, Parma, Siena, Pro Vercelli – 2003–05, 2008–09, 2010–11, 2017–18
Renan – Sampdoria – 2011–12
Rincon – Ancona, Piacenza, Grosseto – 2008–11
Romeu – Ravenna – 1999–2000
Ronaldo Pompeu – Mantova, Padova, Grosseto, Empoli, Pro Vercelli, Salernitana, Novara – 2009–18
Rubinho – Genoa, Torino – 2006–07, 2010–11

S
Vítor Saba – Brescia – 2012–14
Luís Gabriel Sacilotto – Cesena, Nocerina – 2006–08, 2011–12
César Augusto Sant'Anna – Crotone – 2000–01
Bruno Siciliano – Bari – 1964–65
Guilherme Siqueira – Ancona – 2008–09
Sodinha – Bari, Brescia, Trapani – 2008–09, 2012–16
Gabriel Strefezza – SPAL, Cremonese, Lecce – 2016–17, 2018–19, 2020–22

T
Rodrigo Taddei – Siena, Perugia – 2002–03, 2014–15
Teco – Salernitana – 2002–03
Tesser – Lecce – 2006–07
Thiago – Genoa – 2003–05
Thomas – Siena – 2013–14
Tita – Pescara – 1989–90
Rômulo Eugênio Togni – Arezzo, Pescara, Avellino – 2006–07, 2011–12, 2013–14
Robson Toledo – Ascoli, Ravenna, Triestina – 2004–05, 2007–08, 2010–11

V
Vanderson – Treviso – 2008–09
Ronaldo Vanin – Catanzaro – 2005–06
Vincente – Treviso, Padova – 2008–09, 2010–11
Vinícius – Padova, Perugia – 2013–15

W
Wágner – Modena – 2010–11
William (Justino Clovis William) – Ascoli – 2008–09
William (William Nascimento Lacerda) – Modena – 2012–13
Wilker – Treviso – 2006–07, 2008–09

Z
Adrián Zanettin – Verona – 1935–36
Zé Elias – Genoa – 2003–04
Zé Eduardo – Empoli, Padova – 2011–13

See also
List of foreign Serie B players
List of Brazilian footballers in Serie A

Notes

References

Italian footballers
Brazilian
Association football player non-biographical articles